"I Cain't Say No" is a song from the 1943 musical play Oklahoma! written by composer Richard Rodgers and lyricist/librettist Oscar Hammerstein II, initially performed by Celeste Holm.

In the song Ado Annie Carnes describes her sexual awakening (albeit in highly euphemistic terms) and the conflicts that it brings. One of two female leads, Ado Annie has a pair of principal suitors, a Persian traveling salesman Ali Hakim and the cowboy Will Parker, recently returned from an excursion to Kansas City. She describes to her friend Laurey the attention she is now receiving from men "since she filled out" and her inability to say "no" to their advances.

Sample lyrics:
It ain't so much a question of not knowing what to do.
I knowed what's right and wrong since I was ten.
I heared a lot of stories and I reckon they are true
About how girls're put upon by men.
I know I mustn't fall into the pit
But when I'm with a feller,
I fergit!

I'm just a girl who cain't say no
I'm in a terrible fix
I always say "come on, let's go!"
Jist when I orta say nix...

References

See also
"All Er Nuthin'", near the end of the musical where Will extracts a promise of fidelity from Annie, and vice versa.

1943 songs
Comedy songs
Songs from Oklahoma!
Songs with music by Richard Rodgers
Songs with lyrics by Oscar Hammerstein II